Richard Joseph Tonry (September 30, 1893 – January 17, 1971) was an American politician from New York.

Life
Born in Brooklyn, he was educated in the public schools and at Randolph Military Academy (in Montclair, New Jersey) and at the Pratt Institute in Brooklyn. During World War I he served as a sergeant in the United States Marine Corps (1917–1921) and in 1921 engaged in the real estate and the insurance brokerage business.

He was a member of the New York State Assembly (Kings Co., 9th D.) in 1922, 1923, 1924, 1925, 1926, 1927, 1928 and 1929 and a member of the New York City Board of Aldermen from 1930 to 1934.

Tonry was elected as a Democrat to the 74th United States Congress, holding office from January 3, 1935, to January 3, 1937. He was a delegate to the Democratic State conventions in 1938, 1940, 1942, and 1946. He was Journal Clerk of the U.S. House of Representatives from 1943 to 1946.

In 1947, he was appointed as a commissioner of appraisal for the Corporation Counsel of New York City. He was a real estate and insurance broker and in 1971 died in Brooklyn. He was buried in the United States Military Cemetery on Long Island.

References

1893 births
1971 deaths
Politicians from Brooklyn
United States Marines
Democratic Party members of the New York State Assembly
Democratic Party members of the United States House of Representatives from New York (state)
20th-century American politicians
Pratt Institute alumni